A Pagan Place is a 1970 novel by Irish writer Edna O'Brien. The book was first published on April 16, 1970, by Weidenfeld & Nicolson and follows a young girl in the 1930s and 1940s. In 1972 A Pagan Place was adapted into a stage production, which received mixed reviews.

Style
A Pagan Place is narrated in second person in its entirety. As Shahriyar Mansouri argues, such a "melodic" narratorial voice, presented through the mouthpiece of second-person narrator signifies a lost sense of identity and independence for the post-independence Irish women.  The only occasion when the narratorial voice appropriates the first person pronoun 'I', indicating its presence and self-recognition, comes at the end of the novel, where the unnamed, young female protagonist embarks on her journey of formation.

Reception
The Sydney Morning Herald praised the book's narrative, saying that it "flows along absorbingly without a line of direct dialogue".

References

1970 novels
Novels by Edna O'Brien
Weidenfeld & Nicolson books
20th-century Irish novels